The Garth Brooks Collection is the first compilation album of American country pop artist Garth Brooks. It was released on September 2, 1994  (see 1994 in country music) and contains 10 of Brooks' favorite songs, including his debut single, "Much Too Young (To Feel This Damn Old)".

Track listings

Certifications

References

Garth Brooks compilation albums
1994 compilation albums
Capitol Records compilation albums
Albums produced by Allen Reynolds